The Pelamis Wave Energy Converter was a technology that used the motion of ocean surface waves to create electricity. The machine was made up of connected sections which flex and bend as waves pass; it is this motion which is used to generate electricity.

Developed by the now defunct 
Scottish company Pelamis Wave Power (formerly Ocean Power Delivery), the Pelamis became the first offshore wave machine to generate electricity into the grid, when it was first connected to the UK grid in 2004. Pelamis Wave Power then went on to build and test five additional Pelamis machines: three first-generation P1 machines, which were tested in a farm off the coast of Portugal in 2009, and two second-generation machines, the Pelamis P2, were tested off Orkney between 2010 and 2014. The company went into administration in November 2014, with the intellectual property transferred to the Scottish Government body Wave Energy Scotland.

Operation

The Pelamis machine is an offshore wave energy converter, operating in water depths greater than 50m.  The machine consists of a series of semi-submerged cylindrical sections linked by hinged joints. As waves pass along the length of the machine, the sections move relative to one another. The wave-induced motion of the sections is resisted by hydraulic cylinders which pump high pressure oil through hydraulic motors via smoothing hydraulic accumulators. The hydraulic motors drive electrical generators to produce electricity. Electricity from all the joints is fed down a single umbilical cable to a junction on the sea bed. Several devices can be connected and linked to shore through a single seabed cable.

Principle

The Pelamis is an attenuating wave energy converter.   The machine responds to the curvature of the waves (their shape) rather than the wave height. As waves can only reach a certain curvature before naturally breaking, this limits the range of motion through which the machine must move but maintains large motion at the joints in small waves.

Projects

P2 Pelamis testing at EMEC

The P2 Pelamis design was Pelamis Wave Power's second generation Pelamis machine.  The Pelamis P2 is 180m long, 4m diameter and approximately 1350 tonnes in weight.  Consisting of five tube sections and four flexible joints, the design is longer and fatter than the previous P1 design.

In 2010, Pelamis Wave Power began tests of the first Pelamis P2 machine at the European Marine Energy Centre, Orkney, Scotland. The machine was owned by the German utility company, E.ON, and was the UK's first commercial supply contract in the marine energy sector. In March 2010 Pelamis Wave Power announced a second order for a P2 machine, from ScottishPower Renewables, part of Iberdrola Renovables. This second machine was first installed at EMEC in May 2012. The two utility companies announced that they will work together to share and collaborate in testing of the P2 Pelamis technology.

Following the demise of the company, the P2-001 device was acquired by Wave Energy Scotland, having completed over 15,000 hours of operation. The device was decommissioned in April 2016 and sold to the Orkney Island Council for £1. The other device, P2-002 was sold to the European Marine Energy Centre for use as a test rig.

Projects formerly in development
E.ON and ScottishPower Renewables announced plans to build larger projects using Pelamis machines in the waters off Orkney's west coast. Both companies won leases in 2010 from The Crown Estate, who own the seabed around the UK, for projects of up to 50 MW. The "Pentland Firth and Orkney Waters Leasing Round" was the world's first commercial scale wave and tidal energy leasing opportunity.

Development history

Prototype Pelamis Machine

Pelamis Wave Power tested their first full-scale prototype at the European Marine Energy Centre in Orkney, Scotland between 2004 and 2007. The machine, which was rated at 750 kW, was the world's first offshore wave power machine to generate electricity into the grid system.

The prototype was 120m long and 3.5m in diameter. It consisted of four tube sections linked by three, shorter, and power conversion modules

Aguçadoura Wave Farm

In 2008 Pelamis tested three first generation, P1 Pelamis waves at the Aguçadoura Wave Farm. Located off the northwest coast of Portugal near Póvoa de Varzim, the farm had an installed capacity of 2.25 MW and was the world's first multiple machine wave power project. The project was part funded by Portuguese utility Enersis, at the time owned by Australian global investment company Babcock & Brown. The farm first generated electricity in July 2008 but was taken offline in November 2008 at the same time as Babcock & Brown encountered financial difficulties.

Etymology 
Pelamis platurus is a yellow-bellied sea snake that lives in tropical and subtropical waters. It prefers shallow inshore waters.

Hailong 1 
The Hailong (Dragon) 1 is a Chinese wave energy machine reported to be a near perfect copy of the Pelamis which began testing in 2015 in the South China Sea. It was reported to have been based on IP stolen from Pelamis during a 2011 heist.

Images

See also 

Wave Energy
Ocean Grazer
Pelamis Wave Power
Aegir wave farm

References

External links
Aegir Wave Power
The European Marine Energy Test Centre
The Power Technology website
Pelamis Secures Wave Energy Order from E.on
Pelamis at Aguçadoura video

2007 introductions
Buildings and structures in Orkney
Wave energy converters
Wave farms in Portugal
Wave farms in Scotland